Maxwell Henry Smith (21 December 1917 – 27 October 1941) was an Australian rules footballer who played with Essendon in the Victorian Football League (VFL).

Smith died on 27 October 1941 as a result of an injury sustained while batting in a cricket match for Werribee South two days earlier. He was struck by a ball which deflected off the bat onto his temple. The ball was bowled by his younger brother Clive Smith, who later played football for North Melbourne.

Notes

External links 

1917 births
1941 deaths
Australian rules footballers from Geelong
Essendon Football Club players
Accidental deaths in Victoria (Australia)
Sport deaths in Australia
Cricket deaths
People from Werribee, Victoria